Edgar George Leonard Howitt (1909-1975) was an English rower.

Rowing
He competed in the eights at the 1930 British Empire Games for England and won a gold medal.

Personal life
He was an clerk at the time of the 1930 Games.

References

1909 births
1975 deaths
English male rowers
Commonwealth Games medallists in rowing
Commonwealth Games gold medallists for England
Rowers at the 1930 British Empire Games
Medallists at the 1930 British Empire Games